The American College of Osteopathic Internists (ACOI) is a medical association in the United States representing osteopathic physicians that specialize in internal medicine. The ACOI is one of two professional organizations representing internal medicine physicians in the United States, the other organization is the American College of Physicians. ACOI is accredited by the Accreditation Council for Continuing Medical Education (CME).

History
ACOI was founded in 1923 as the American Society of Osteopathic Internists. In 1941, the organization adopted its current name, American College of Osteopathic Internists.

Fellows
The honor of fellow is bestowed upon members that exhibit dedication to the profession.  The recipient receives becomes a Fellow of the American College of Osteopathic Internists, which is abbreviated FACOI.  Honorary versions of this award are also given.  On November 14, 1979, Linus Pauling received an Honorary Fellow of the American College of Osteopathic Internists by the ACOI for delivering a presentation at the ACOI Convocation.

See also
 American Osteopathic Board of Internal Medicine
 American Osteopathic Board of Surgery

References 

Osteopathic medical associations in the United States
Medical and health organizations based in Maryland